Marcus Vinícius Lima da Silva, known as Marcão (literally Marcus the elder) or Marcus Vinícius (born 26 April 1990), is a Brazilian footballer who plays for Richmond SC.

Biography
Born in Curitiba, Paraná, Marcão started his career at Atlético Paranaense. He signed a 3-year contract in April 2007. In May 2009 he left for 
Marília in 3-year contract. He played once in 2009 Campeonato Brasileiro Série C, at that time known as Marcus Vinícius on 26 July 2009.

After played for the team at 2010 Campeonato Paulista Série A2, he was signed by Campeonato Gaúcho Segunda Divisão club Cerâmica. He finished as the runner-up of 2010 Copa FGF.

References

External links
 CBF Contract Record 
 

1990 births
Living people
Footballers from Curitiba
Brazilian footballers
Marília Atlético Clube players
Cerâmica Atlético Clube players
Rio Branco Sport Club players
Maringá Futebol Clube players
Esporte Clube Novo Hamburgo players
Association football central defenders
Campeonato Brasileiro Série C players
Campeonato Brasileiro Série D players
Campeonato Paranaense players
V.League 1 players
Brazilian expatriate footballers
Brazilian expatriate sportspeople in Vietnam
Expatriate footballers in Vietnam